Heston and Isleworth may refer to:

 Municipal Borough of Heston and Isleworth
 Heston and Isleworth (UK Parliament constituency)